Aniket Chattopadhyay (born 9 January 1963) is an Indian journalist and film director in Bengali cinema. He has directed the films, Chha-e Chhuti (2009), Bye Bye Bangkok (2011), the romantic comedy film Goraay Gondogol (2012), Mahapurush O Kapurush (2013), Janala Diye Bou Palalo (2014), Room No. 103 (2015), Shankar Mudi (2019), and Kabir (2018). He was also the news editor of Bengali news channel Kolkata TV.

Filmography
 Chha-e Chhuti (2009)
 Bye Bye Bangkok (2011)
 Goraay Gondogol (2012)
 Mahapurush O Kapurush (2013)
 Janala Diye Bou Palalo (2014)
 Room No. 103 (2015)
 Kiriti Roy (2016 film)
 Kabir (2018)
 Hoichoi Unlimited (2018)
 Tuski (2018)
 Shankar Mudi (2019)
 Hobu Chandra Raja Gobu Chandra Mantri (2021)

References

External links

 

1963 births
Living people
Film directors from Kolkata
Bengali film directors
Indian male journalists
Journalists from West Bengal
21st-century Indian film directors